

The Renard R.34 was a 1930s Belgian two-seat biplane trainer designed by Alfred Renard and built by Societé Anonyme des Avions et Moteurs Renard.

Design and development
The R.34 was built for a Belgian military competition in October 1933 for an aerobatic and general-purpose biplane. The R.34 was a biplane that first flew on 21 July 1934 powered by a  Renard 200 radial engine. It was also fitted with a  Armstrong Siddeley Lynx engine fitted with a Townend ring. The competition was won by the Avro Tutor and, although the R.24 was later flown in a number of military configurations, it did not enter production.

Specifications (with Renard 200)

Notes

Bibliography

R.35
1930s Belgian military trainer aircraft
Aerobatic aircraft
Biplanes
Single-engined tractor aircraft
Aircraft first flown in 1934